Francis Bosley Crowther Jr. (July 13, 1905 – March 7, 1981) was an American journalist, writer, and film critic for The New York Times for 27 years. His work helped shape the careers of many actors, directors and screenwriters, though his reviews, at times, were perceived as unnecessarily mean. Crowther was an advocate of foreign-language films in the 1950s and 1960s, particularly those of Roberto Rossellini, Vittorio De Sica, Ingmar Bergman, and Federico Fellini.

Life and career
Crowther was born Francis Bosley Crowther Jr. in Lutherville, Maryland, the son of Eliza Hay (née Leisenring, 1877–1960) and Francis Bosley Crowther (1874–1950). As a child, Crowther moved to Winston-Salem, North Carolina, where he published a neighborhood newspaper, The Evening Star. His family moved to Washington, D.C., and Crowther graduated from Western High School in 1922. After two years of prep school at Woodberry Forest School, he entered Princeton University, where he majored in history. For his writing, Crowther was offered a job as a cub reporter for The New York Times at a salary of $30 per week. He declined the offer, made to him by the publisher Adolph S. Ochs, hoping to find employment on a small Southern newspaper. When the salary offered by those papers wasn't half of the Times offer, he went to New York and took the job. He was the first nightclub reporter for the Times, and in 1933 was asked by Brooks Atkinson to join the drama department. He spent five years covering the theater scene in New York, and even dabbled in writing for it.

While at the Times in those early years, Crowther met Florence Marks, a fellow employee; the couple married on January 20, 1933. They had three sons, Bosley Crowther III, an attorney; John M. Crowther, a writer and artist; and Jefferson, a banker and the father of Welles Remy Crowther.

Film criticism
Crowther was a prolific writer of film essays as a critic for The New York Times from 1940 to 1967. Perhaps conscious of the power of his reviews, New York Times obituarist Robert D. McFadden considered his tone to be "scholarly rather than breezy". Frank Beaver wrote in Bosley Crowther: Social Critic of the Film, 1940–1967 that Crowther opposed displays of patriotism in films and believed that a movie producer "should balance his political attitudes even in the uncertain times of the 1940s and 1950s, during the House Un-American Activities Committee". Crowther's review of the wartime drama Mission to Moscow (1943), made during the period when the Soviet Union was one of the Allied Powers with the United States, chided the film by saying it should show "less ecstasy", and wrote:
"It is just as ridiculous to pretend that Russia has been a paradise of purity as it is to say the same thing about ourselves".

In the 1950s, Crowther was an opponent of Senator Joseph R. McCarthy, whose anti-communist crusade targeted the State Department, the administration of Harry S. Truman, the U.S. Army, and individual government employees. However, he also criticised the left-wing film Knock on Any Door for blaming law-abiding society for a juvenile deliquent's descent into murder: "Rubbish! The only shortcoming of society which this film proves is that it casually tolerates the pouring of such fraudulence onto the public mind."

Crowther opposed censorship of movies, and advocated greater social responsibility in the making of them. He approved of movies with social content, such as Gone with the Wind (1939), The Grapes of Wrath (1940), Citizen Kane (1941), The Lost Weekend (1945), All the King's Men (1949), and High Noon (1952).

Crowther barely concealed his disdain for Joan Crawford when reviewing her films, saying that her acting style in Female on the Beach (1955) was characterized by "artificiality" and "pretentiousness," and also chided Crawford for her physical bearing. In his review of the Nicholas Ray film Johnny Guitar (1954), Crowther complained that "no more femininity comes from (Crawford) than from rugged Mr. Heflin in Shane (1953). For the lady, as usual, is as sexless as the lions on the public library steps and as sharp and romantically forbidding as a package of unwrapped razor blades".

His preferences in popular movies were not always predictable. He defended epics such as Ben-Hur (1959) and Cleopatra (1963), but gave the World War II film The Great Escape (also 1963) a highly unfavorable review, and panned David Lean's later works. He called Lawrence of Arabia (1962) a "thundering camel-opera that tends to run down rather badly as it rolls on into its third hour and gets involved with sullen disillusion and political deceit."

Crowther often admired foreign-language films, especially the works of Roberto Rossellini, Vittorio De Sica, Ingmar Bergman, and Federico Fellini. However he was critical of some iconic releases as well. He found Akira Kurosawa's classic Throne of Blood (1957, but not released in the U.S. until 1961), derived from Macbeth, ludicrous, particularly its ending; and called Gojira (Godzilla) (1954) "an incredibly awful film". Crowther dismissed Alfred Hitchcock's Psycho (1960) as "a blot on an otherwise honorable career". He soon reassessed the film, considering it one of the top ten movies of the year, writing that Psycho was a "bold psychological mystery picture.... [I]t represented expert and sophisticated command of emotional development with cinematic techniques." He commented that while Satyajit Ray's Pather Panchali (1955, US: 1958) took on "a slim poetic form" the structure and tempo of it "would barely pass as a 'rough cut' with editors in Hollywood". Writing about L'Avventura (1960), Crowther said that watching the film was "like trying to follow a showing of a picture at which several reels have got lost."

The career of Bosley Crowther is discussed at length in For the Love of Movies: The Story of American Film Criticism, including his support for foreign-language cinema and his public repudiation of McCarthyism and the Blacklist. In this 2009 documentary film, contemporary critics who appreciate his work, such as A. O. Scott, appear, but also those who found his work too moralistic, such as Richard Schickel, Molly Haskell, and Andrew Sarris.

Bonnie and Clyde criticism
The end of Crowther's career was marked by his disdain for the 1967 film Bonnie and Clyde. He was critical of what he saw as the film's sensationalized violence. His review was negative:

Other critics besides Crowther panned the movie. John Simon, the critic of New York magazine, while praising its technical execution, declared "Slop is slop, even served with a silver ladle." Its distributor pulled the film from circulation. However, the critical consensus on Bonnie and Clyde reversed, exemplified by two high-profile reassessments by Time and Newsweek. The latter's Joe Morgenstern wrote two reviews in consecutive issues, the second retracting and apologizing for the first. Time hired Stefan Kanfer as its new film critic in late 1967; his first assignment was an ostentatious rebuttal of his magazine's original negative review. A rave in The New Yorker by Pauline Kael was also influential.

Even in the wake of this critical reversal, however, Crowther remained one of the film's most dogged critics. He eventually wrote three negative reviews and periodically blasted the movie in reviews of other films and in a letters column response to unhappy Times readers. The New York Times replaced Crowther as its primary film critic in early 1968, and some observers speculated that his persistent attacks on Bonnie and Clyde had shown him to be out of touch with current cinema and weighed heavily in his removal. Crowther worked as an executive consultant at Columbia Pictures after leaving the Times.

Crowther wrote The Lion's Share: The Story of an Entertainment Empire (1957), the first book documenting the history of Metro-Goldwyn-Mayer, and Hollywood Rajah: The Life and Times of Louis B. Mayer (1960), a biography of the head of the MGM studio.

Death
Crowther died of heart failure on March 7, 1981, at Northern Westchester Hospital in Mount Kisco, New York. He was survived by his wife Florence, who died in 1984; a sister, Nancy Crowther Kappes; three sons, F. Bosley, John, and Jefferson; and four grandchildren.

References

Sources
 Bosley Crowther: Social Critic of the Film, 1940–1967 by Frank Eugene Beaver, Ayer Publishing, 1974.  
 Kellye, Beverly M., Reelpolitik II: Political Ideologies in '50s and '60s Films, Rowman & Littlefield (2004), 
 The Lion's Share: The Story of an Entertainment Empire. Ams Prs Inc, 1957.  
 The Great Films: Fifty Golden Years of Motion Pictures. New York: Putnam, 1971.

External links
The New York Times links to numerous film reviews by Bosley Crowther
Speech at DePauw University; February 6, 1948

1905 births
1981 deaths
American film critics
Critics employed by The New York Times
Princeton University alumni
People from Lutherville, Maryland
Writers from Winston-Salem, North Carolina
20th-century American non-fiction writers
Woodberry Forest School alumni
20th-century American male writers
American male non-fiction writers